Beatrix Zoufal (born 19 May 1970), née Müllner, is a former synchronized swimmer from Austria. 

References 

1970 births
Living people
Austrian synchronized swimmers
Olympic synchronized swimmers of Austria
Synchronized swimmers at the 1992 Summer Olympics